Institut für Mikrosystemtechnik (IMTEK; "Department of Microsystems Engineering") at the University of Freiburg is Germany's largest research institute dedicated to all aspects of MEMS and Microsystems Engineering. It currently has more than 650 graduate students and 23 research groups. The department is active in both fundamental and applied research.

Research groups
IMTEK consists of the following research groups, each led by a tenured professor:
 MEMS Applications
 Assembly and Packaging
 Biomedical Microtechnology
 Bio Microtechnics
 Bio- and Nano-Photonics
 Chemistry and Physics of Interfaces
 Electrical Instrumentation
 Design of Microsystems
 Microsystem Materials
 Micro-actuators
 Microelectronics
 Micro-optics
 Nanotechnology
 Process Technology
 Sensors
 Simulation
 Systems Theory
 Compound Semiconductor Microsystems
 Materials Process Technology

In addition, IMTEK has established interdisciplinary graduate colleges for the following themes: 
 Embedded Microsystems
 Micro Energy Harvesting

Cleanroom 
IMTEK houses a 600 sqm advanced cleanroom that is used for training and research. IMTEK is also a hub of regional and national collaborative research between academia and industry.

References

External links
 Albert Ludwigs University of Freiburg
 

University of Freiburg

ar:جامعة فرايبورغ
es:Universidad de Friburgo (Alemania)
fr:Université de Fribourg-en-Brisgau
ko:프라이부르크 대학교
mr:फ्रायबुर्ग विद्यापीठ
ja:フライブルク大学
no:Albert-Ludwigs-Universität
pl:Uniwersytet we Fryburgu
pt:Universidade de Freiburg
sh:Albert Ludwigs Universitaet
sv:Albert-Ludwigs-Universität
zh:弗莱堡大学